Wayne Seybold (born September 5, 1963) is formerly the mayor of Marion, Indiana and a former Olympic pair skater representing the United States. 

Competing with his sister Natalie Seybold, he won five senior international medals, became a two-time U.S. national silver medalist, and competed at the 1988 Winter Olympics. The pair grew up in Marion, Indiana and were coached by Ronald Ludington from 1984 in Wilmington, Delaware.

After retiring from skating, Seybold returned to Marion, Indiana. Running as a Republican, he was elected mayor in 2003 and won re-election in 2007 and 2011. In 2012, Seybold ran for the 5th District Congressional seat but finished fourth in the Republican primary. In 2014, he ran for Indiana State Treasurer but lost the Republican nomination to director of the TrustINdiana local government investment pool Kelly Mitchell.

Results
(with Natalie Seybold)

References

1963 births
American athlete-politicians
American male pair skaters
Figure skaters at the 1988 Winter Olympics
Living people
Olympic figure skaters of the United States
People from Marion, Indiana
Mayors of places in Indiana
Indiana Republicans